Soth Sun (born 1 January 1946) is a Cambodian boxer. He competed in the men's featherweight event at the 1972 Summer Olympics.

References

External links
 

1946 births
Living people
Cambodian male boxers
Olympic boxers of Cambodia
Boxers at the 1972 Summer Olympics
Place of birth missing (living people)
Featherweight boxers